Piazza delle Erbe (Market's square) is a square in Verona, northern Italy.  It was once the town's forum during the time of the Roman Empire.

Description
The northern side of the square is occupied by the ancient town hall, the Torre dei Lamberti, the Casa dei Giudici ("Judges' Hall") and the frescoed Mazzanti Houses. The western side, the shortest one, features the Baroque Palazzo Maffei, decorated by statues of Greek gods. It is faced by a white marble column, on which is St. Mark's Lion, symbol of the Republic of Venice.

The north-western side occupies the site of the ancient Roman Capitol Hill, which looked towards the forum. Numerous of its buildings facing the square have maintained façade frescoes. On the southern side is the crenellated Casa dei Mercanti ("House of the Merchants", also known as Domus Mercatorum), now the seat of the Banca Popolare di Verona. Other buildings, the tall houses of the Ghetto, are reminiscent of medieval tower-houses.

The square's most ancient monument is the fountain (built in 1368 by Cansignorio della Scala), surmounted by a statue called Madonna Verona, which is however a Roman sculpture dating to 380 AD. Also historical is the capitello, dating to the 13th century, during which it was used for several ceremonies, including the oath of investment of the city's medieval podestà and pretors. Towards Via Cappello is another column, with a 14th-century aedicula with reliefs of the Virgin and the Saints Zeno, Peter and Christopher.

Buildings around the square
Palazzo Maffei
Torre dei Lamberti
Casa dei Mercanti
St. Mark's Lion

Erbe, Piazza delle